Sophie Leblond is a Canadian film editor. She is most noted for her work on the films Soft Shell Man (Un crabe dans la tête), for which she won the Jutra Award for Best Editing at the 4th Jutra Awards in 2002, and Alexander Odyssey (Alexandre le fou), for which she won the Canadian Screen Award for Best Editing in a Documentary at the 8th Canadian Screen Awards in 2020.

Awards and nominations

References

External links

Canadian film editors
Canadian women film editors
Best Editing in a Documentary Canadian Screen Award winners
French Quebecers
Living people
Year of birth missing (living people)